Malakpur is a village in Ludhiana-2 Block in Ludhiana District in Punjab, India. The population was estimated as 2,200 in 2011. It has an area of about 480 hectares.

It is situated on the Ludhiana to Hambran Road to the west of Ludhiana, 3 km from the Sutlej River. It is very near to Punjab Agricultural University and to South City Ludhiana. Malakpur is 10.30 km far from its Main Town, Ludhiana, and 110 km from the State Main City Chandigarh. 
The nearest railway station is at Lludhiana, 8 km away.

The tehsil of Malakpur Is Ludhiana (West); the tehsil number is 147. Malakpur's pincode is 142027.

Etymology
Malakpur (ਮਲਕਪੁਰ) is derived from malak (angel) and is related to the name of a person. The term pur occurs approximately 30 times in the Rig Veda; it is often translated as city, castle or fortress.

History
Malakpur is a very old village. Before the partition of India and Pakistan in 1947, most of the population were Muslims. After 1947, the Muslims moved to Pakistan and Sikhs came to the village. Most of the Sikhs in Malakpur have the surnames Grewal, Gill, Sekhon, Kairrey and Kaler. Most of Sekhons had come from Layallpur (Pakistan) and are natives of Dakha village of Ludhiana. Most of the Grewals were natives of Himmayun Pura village in Ludhiana District. The main source of income of village people is agriculture.

Pin code 
Malakpur PIN code (Postal Index Number) is 142027 and it post office name is Ayali KalanN. Other villages using this PIN are Ayali Khurd, Malakpur, Ayali Kalan, Birmi and Jainpur.

Nearby villages 
Nearby villages are Birmi (1.67 km), Ayali Khurd (3.40 km), Nurpur Bet (3.44 km), Partap Singhwala (3.8 km), Bains (5.30 km), Ayali Kalan (5.77 km), Jhamat (3.44 km), Hambran (6.55 km) and Jainpur (632.31 m)

See also
 Ludhiana
 Punjab, India
 India

External links
 ludhiana
 myludhiana
 ludhianaonline
 Map Of Malakpur Bet

  Villages in Ludhiana district